A large number of date cultivars and varieties emerged through history of its cultivation, but the exact number is difficult to assess. Hussain and El-Zeid (1975) have reported 400 varieties, while Nixon (1954) named around 250. Most of those are limited to a particular region, and only a few dozen have attained broader commercial importance. The most renowned cultivars worldwide include Deglet Noor, originally of Algeria; Zahidi and Hallawi of Iraq; Medjool of Morocco; Mazafati of Iran.

Most of the information in the following list is from Date Palm Genetic Resources and Utilization by Al-Khayri et al. (2015).

List

In Gaza
The Gaza Strip, especially Deir al-Balah ("Village of Dates"), is known for its exceptionally sweet red dates.

See also
Date cultivation in Dar al-Manasir#Date cultivars

References

Further reading
  – extensive reference about date cultivars of Tunisia

 
Lists of cultivars
Lists of foods